Kunchang Kangri is a mountain peak located at 6,751m (22,149ft) above sea level in the easternmost subrange of the Karakoram range in India.

Location 
The peak is located east of Tegar, a high-altitude village in Nubra subdivision in the Leh district of Union territory of Ladakh (India).

First ascent 
On July 22, 2018; an Estonian Karakorum expedition team consisting of Kristjan-Erik Suurväli, (group leader), Sven Oja (frontrunner), Priit Joosu, Lauri Ehrenpreis, Meelis Luukas, Priit Simson and Lauri Stern reached the summit.

References 

Mountains of the Transhimalayas
Six-thousanders of the Transhimalayas
Mountains of Ladakh